The 1932 Labour Party leadership election took place after the defeat of the Labour Party in the 1931 general election and the defeat in his own constituency of the party leader, Arthur Henderson. Labour was reduced from 287 members to 46 members; George Lansbury was the only senior member of the Labour leadership to retain his seat.

As the only candidate to stand, Lansbury was elected leader unopposed by the Parliamentary Labour Party.

Notes

References
 

1932
Labour Party leadership election
Labour Party leadership election